Florin Ionescu (born 3 February 1971 in Iași) is a retired Romanian athlete who specialised in the 3000 metres steeplechase. He represented his country at two Olympic Games, in 1996 and 2000. In addition he reached the final at three consecutive World Championships starting in 1995.

His personal best in the event is 8:13.26 set in Seville in 1999. This is the standing national record.

Competition record

References

1971 births
Living people
Sportspeople from Iași
Romanian male steeplechase runners
Olympic athletes of Romania
Athletes (track and field) at the 1996 Summer Olympics
Athletes (track and field) at the 2000 Summer Olympics
World Athletics Championships athletes for Romania